The Church of Santa María de Palacio (Spanish: Iglesia de Santa María de Palacio) is a church located in Logroño, Spain. It was declared Bien de Interés Cultural in 1943.

Reredos
The reredos, created by Italian artists, was originally built for the Co-cathedral of Santa María de la Redonda, but the cathedral chapter rejected it because it contained coats of arms of the donor, Arnao de Bruselas, being donated to the church of Palacio.

References 

Bien de Interés Cultural landmarks in La Rioja (Spain)
Churches in La Rioja (Spain)